Mississauga, historically known as Toronto Township, is a city in the Canadian province of Ontario. It is situated on the shores of Lake Ontario in the Regional Municipality of Peel, adjoining the western border of Toronto. With a population of 717,961 as of 2021, Mississauga is the seventh-most populous municipality in Canada, third-most in Ontario, and second-most in the Greater Toronto Area (GTA) after Toronto itself. However, for the first time in its history, the city's population declined according to the 2021 census, from a 2016 population of 721,599 to 717,961, a 0.5 percent decrease.

The growth of Mississauga was attributed to its proximity to Toronto. During the latter half of the 20th century, the city attracted a multicultural population and built up a thriving central business district. Malton, a neighbourhood of the city located in its northeast end, is home to Toronto Pearson International Airport, Canada's busiest airport, as well as the headquarters of many Canadian and multinational corporations. Mississauga is not a traditional city, but is instead an amalgamation of three former villages, two townships, and a number of rural hamlets (a general pattern common to several suburban GTA cities) that were significant population centres, with none being clearly dominant, prior to the city's incorporation that later coalesced into a single urban area.

Indigenous people have lived in the area for thousands of years and Mississauga is situated on the traditional territory of the Huron-Wendat, Haudenosaunee and Anishinaabeg people, including the namesake Mississaugas. Most of present-day Mississauga was founded in 1805 as Toronto Township within York County, and became part of Peel County when new counties were formed by splitting off parts of the original county in 1851. Mississauga itself was established in 1968 as a town, and was reincorporated as a city in 1974, when Peel was restructured into a regional municipality.

Etymology
The name Mississauga comes from the Anishinaabe word , meaning "[Those at the] Great River-mouth".

Other forms such as Sauga and, in reference to the city's residents, Saugans, and Mississaugans, are also commonly used.

History

Palaeo-Indian period (9000–8500 BCE) 
A single site in Mississauga with Hi-Lo projectile points was registered in the Ontario Ministry of Culture database of archaeological sites. Lake Ontario was much smaller at this time, and sites from this period may be 500 m into the lake.

Archaic period (8000–1000 BCE) 
According to Smith, there was a growing population at this time. There are 23 known Archaic sites in Mississauga, mostly in the Credit River and Cooksville Creek drainage systems. People would congregate at rapids and the mouths of these rivers to catch fish during spawning runs. They would harvest nuts and wild rice at the wetland margins in the late summer. During late Archaic times, there were large cemeteries.

Woodland period (1000 BCE–1650 CE) 
"The accelerating upward population increase continued," with 23 known sites from this period. Pottery first appears during this period in the style of the Point Peninsula complex, and near the end of the Woodland period, the first semi-permanent villages appear. Artifacts show that residents of Mississauga engaged in long-distance trade, likely as part of the Hopewell tradition.

Late Woodland culture (500–1650 CE) 
"The band level of social organization that characterized earlier cultures gave way eventually to the tribal level of the Ontario Iroquoian Tradition," and people began cultivation of crops such as maize, beans, squash, sunflowers, and tobacco. This led to the development of the Wyandot or Huron, Iroquoian-speaking culture. The Lightfoot site with four to six longhouses was located on the Credit River near Mississauga's border with Brampton. Another village with many longhouses was on the Antrex site, located on a wide ridge bounded by two small tributaries of Cooksville Creek.

Arrival of the Haudenosaunee, the Anishinaabe, and the Europeans 
Around the end of the Woodland period, the Haudenosaunee, another Iroquoian confederacy, began to move into the area, and, as part of a long conflict known as the Beaver wars, they had dispersed the Wyandot by 1650. But by 1687, the Haudenosaunee had abandoned their new settlements along the north shore of Lake Ontario.

The Algonquian-speaking Anishinaabe Ojibwe people had been aligned with the Wyandot, and when they were dispersed, the Anishinaabe expanded eastward into the Credit River Valley area, clashing with the Haudenosaunee and eventually taking over when the Haudenosaunee retreated. The European traders would gather annually at the mouth of what is now known as the Credit River to give the Anishinaabe credit for the following year. "From this, the Mississauga bands at the western end of the lake became known collectively as the Credit River Mississaugas."

Toronto Township, consisting of most of present-day Mississauga, was formed on 2 August 1805  when officials from York (what is now the City of Toronto) purchased 85,000 acres (340 km2) of land from the Mississaugas under Treaty 14. A second treaty was signed in 1818 that surrendered 2,622 km2 of Mississauga land to the British Crown. In total Mississauga is covered by four treaties: Treaty 14, Treaty 19, Treaty 22 and Treaty 23.

The original villages (and some later incorporated towns) settled included Clarkson, Cooksville, Dixie, Erindale (called Springfield until 1890), Lakeview, Lorne Park, Port Credit, Sheridan, and Summerville. The region became known as Toronto Township. Part of northeast Mississauga, including the Airport lands and Malton were a part of Toronto Gore Township.

After the land was surveyed, the Crown gave much of it in the form of land grants to United Empire Loyalists who emigrated from the Thirteen Colonies during and after the American Revolution, as well as loyalists from New Brunswick. A group of settlers from New York City arrived in the 1830s. The government wanted to compensate the Loyalists for property lost in the colonies and encourage development of what was considered frontier. In 1820, the government purchased additional land from the Mississaugas. Additional settlements were established, including: Barbertown, Britannia, Burnhamthorpe, Churchville, Derry West, Elmbank, Malton, Meadowvale (Village), Mount Charles, and Streetsville. European-Canadian settlement led to the eventual displacement of the Mississaugas. In 1847, the government relocated them to a reserve in the Grand River Valley, near present-day Hagersville. Pre-confederation, the Township of Toronto was formed as a local government; settlements within were not legal villages until much later. Except for small villages, some gristmills and brickworks served by railway lines, most of present-day Mississauga was agricultural land, including fruit orchards, through much of the 19th and first half of the 20th century.

1900 to today 
In the 1920s, cottages were constructed along the shores of Lake Ontario as weekend getaway houses for city dwellers.

In 1937, 1,410.8 acres of land was sold to build Malton Airport (later known as Pearson Airport). It became Canada's busiest airport which later put the end to the community of Elmbank.

The Queen Elizabeth Way (QEW) highway, one of the first controlled-access highways in the world, opened from Highway 27 to Highway 10 in Port Credit, in 1935 and later expanded to Hamilton and Niagara in 1939. The first prototypical suburban developments occurred around the same time, in the area south of the Dixie Road/QEW interchange. Development in general moved north and west from there over time and around established communities. In 1952, Toronto Township annexed the southern portion of Toronto Gore Township. Two large new towns; Erin Mills and (New) Meadowvale, were started in 1968 and 1969, respectively.  
    
While the Township had many settlements within it, none of the hamlets were legally existent, and all residents were represented by a singular Township council (Malton had special status as a police village, allowing it partial autonomy). To reflect the community's shift away from rural to urban, council desired conversion into a town, and in 1965 a call for public input on naming it received thousands of letters offering hundreds of different suggestions. "Mississauga" was chosen by plebiscite over "Sheridan", and in 1968 the reincorporation went forward, absorbing Malton in the process. Port Credit and Streetsville remained separate, uninterested in ceding their autonomy or being taxed to the needs of a growing municipality. Political will, as well as a belief that a larger city would be a hegemony in Peel County, kept Port Credit and Streetsville as independent enclaves within the Town of Mississauga, but both were amalgamated into Mississauga when it reincorporated as a city in 1974. At this time, Mississauga annexed lands west of Winston Churchill Boulevard from Milton in the northwest, in exchange for lands in the northernmost extremity (which included Churchville) south of Steeles Avenue which were transferred to Brampton. That year, Square One Shopping Centre opened; it has since expanded several times.

On 10 November 1979, a 106-car freight train derailed on the CP rail line while carrying explosive and poisonous chemicals just north of the intersection of Mavis Road and Dundas Street. One of the tank cars carrying propane exploded, and since other tank cars were carrying chlorine, the decision was made to evacuate nearby residents. With the possibility of a deadly cloud of chlorine gas spreading through Mississauga, 218,000 people were evacuated.

Residents were allowed to return home once the site was deemed safe. At the time, it was the largest peacetime evacuation in North American history. Due to the speed and efficiency with which it was conducted, many cities later studied and modelled their own emergency plans after Mississauga's. For many years afterwards, the name "Mississauga" was, for Canadians, associated with a major rail disaster.

North American telephone customers placing calls to Mississauga (and other post-1970 Ontario cities) may not recognise the charge details on their bills. The area's incumbent local exchange carrier, Bell Canada, continues to split the city into five historical rate centres–Clarkson, Cooksville, Malton, Port Credit, and Streetsville. However, they are combined as a single Mississauga listing in the phone book. The first Touch-Tone telephones in Canada were introduced in Malton on 15 June 1964.

Also in January 2010, the Mississaugas and the federal government settled a land claim, in which the band of indigenous people received $145,000,000, as just compensation for their land and lost income.

Geography

Mississauga is bounded by Oakville and Milton to the west/southwest, Brampton to the north, Toronto to the east, and Lake Ontario to the south/south-east. Halton Hills borders Mississauga's north-west corner. With the exception of the southeast border with Toronto (Etobicoke Creek), Mississauga shares a land border with all previously mentioned municipalities.

Two major river valleys feed into the lake. The Credit River is by far the longest with the heaviest flow, it divides the western side of Mississauga from the central/eastern portions and enters the lake at the Port Credit harbour. The indented, mostly forested valley was inhabited by first nation peoples long before European exploration of the area. The valley is protected and maintained by the Credit Valley Conservation Authority (CVCA).

Etobicoke Creek forms part of the eastern border of Mississauga with the city of Toronto. North of there it passes through the western limits of Pearson Airport. There have been two aviation accidents, in 1978 and 2005 where aircraft overshot the runway and slid into the Etobicoke creek banks. In 1954, heavy flooding resulted in some homes along the riverbank being swept into the lake after heavy rains from Hurricane Hazel. Since that storm, houses are no longer constructed along the floodplain. The creek and its tributaries are administered by the Toronto and Region Conservation Authority (TRCA).

Most land in Mississauga drains to either of the two main river systems, with the exception of the smaller Mary Fix and Cooksville Creeks which run roughly through the centre of Mississauga entering the lake near Port Credit. Some small streams and reservoirs are part of the Sixteen Mile Creek system in the far north-west corner of the city, but these drain toward the lake in neighbouring Milton and Oakville.

The shoreline of former Glacial Lake Iroquois roughly follows the Dundas Street alignment, although it is not noticeable in some places but is more prominent in others, such as the site of the former brickyard (Shoreline Dr. near Mavis Rd.), the ancient shoreline promenteau affords a clear view of downtown Toronto and Lake Ontario on clear days. The land in Mississauga in ranges from a maximum elevation of 214 m (699 ft) ASL in the far western corner, near the Hwy. 407/401 junction, to a minimum elevation at the Lake Ontario shore of 76 m (249 ft) above sea level.

Apart from the embankments of Credit River valley, it tributaries and the Iroquois shoreline, the only noticeable hills in Mississauga are actually part of the former Britannia Landfill, now a golf course on Terry Fox Way.

Neighbourhoods/areas 

There are 24 neighbourhoods in Mississauga:

 Applewood
 Central Erin Mills
 Churchill Meadows
 Clarkson 
 Cooksville
 Creditview
 East Credit
 Erin Mills
 Erindale
 Fairview
 Hurontario
 Lakeview
 Lisgar
 Lorne Park
 Malton
 Meadowvale
 Meadowvale Village 
 Mineola
 Mississauga Valleys
 Port Credit
 Rathwood
 Rockwood Village
 Sheridan
 Streetsville

Climate
Mississauga's climate is similar to that of Toronto and is considered to be moderate, located in plant hardiness zone 6b. Under the Köppen climate classification, Mississauga has a humid continental climate (Dfa/Dfb). Summers can bring periods of high temperatures accompanied with high humidity. In an average summer, there are an average of 15.8 days where the temperature rises above . Winters can be cold with temperatures that are frequently below freezing. In an average winter, there are an average of 3.9 days on which the temperature falls below . Occasionally, there can be brief periods of warmer weather during the winter season. Compared to the rest of Canada and Ontario, the amount of snowfall received during the season is relatively low. On average, Mississauga receives  of snow per year and there are 44.4 days with measurable snowfall. The climate of Mississauga is officially represented by Pearson International Airport but because of its topography and large surface area conditions can differ depending on location: fog tends to be more common along the lakeshore and in the Credit River Valley at certain times of year, particularly during the spring and autumn.

During snowfalls when temperatures hover close to freezing, northern parts of the city, such as around Derry Road, including Pearson Airport away from warmer Lake Ontario usually get more snow that sticks to the ground because of the lower temperatures. The reverse occurs when a strong storm approaches from the south kicking up lake effect snow, bringing higher snowfall totals to south Mississauga. The city usually experiences at least six months of snow-free weather; however, there is the odd occurrence where snow does fall either in October or May, none which sticks to the ground. The Port Credit and Lakeview areas have a micro-climate more affected by the proximity of the open lake, warming winter temperatures as a result but it can be sharply cooler on spring and summer afternoons, this can also be the case in Clarkson, but with much less consistency.

Most thunderstorms are not severe but can occasionally bring violent winds. The last known tornado to cause significant damage touched down on 7 July 1985, when an F1-rated tornado struck an industrial park in the Meadowvale area (Argentia Road), heavily damaging some buildings and some parked tractor trailers. A relatively strong tornado tore a path across Mississauga (then part of Toronto Township) on 24 June 1923, cutting a swath from present-day Meadowvale to near Cooksville, killing four people and causing massive property damage in a time when most of Mississauga was still rural farmland dotted with fruit orchards.

Demographics

In 2021, 15.2% of the population was under 15 years of age, and 16.6% was 65 years and over. The median age in Mississauga was 40.8.

Ethnicity 

Note: Totals greater than 100% due to multiple origin responses.

Religion 

The 2021 census found the most reported religion in the city to be Christianity (49.9%), with Catholicism (30.4%) making up the largest denomination, followed by Orthodox (3.6%), Anglicanism (2.0%), United Church (1.5%), Pentecostal and other Charismatic churches (1.2%), and other denominations.
The next most reported religions were Islam (17.0%), Hinduism (8.8%) Sikhism (3.4%), Buddhism (2.0%), and Judaism (0.2%). Those who claimed no religious affiliation made up 18.1% of the population.

Language 
The 2021 census found that English was the mother tongue of 44.9% of the population. The next most common mother tongues were Urdu (5.0%), Arabic (4.7%), Mandarin (3.2%), Polish (3.1%), and Punjabi (2.9%). Of the official languages, 96.5% of the population knew English and 6.8% knew French.

Economy

Over 60 of the Fortune 500 companies base their global or Canadian head offices in Mississauga. Some of the strongest industries are pharmaceuticals, banking and finance, electronics and computers, aerospace, transportation parts and equipment industries.

TD Bank also has Corporate IT development centres in the city along with Royal Bank of Canada. Laura Secord Chocolates is headquartered in the city, and Walmart, Kellogg's, Panasonic, Hewlett Packard, and Oracle's Canadian headquarters are also in Mississauga. Regional airline Jazz operates a regional office in Mississauga. Mississauga is also an aircraft development hub with Canadian headquarters of Aerospace companies such as Magellan Aerospace and Honeywell Aerospace.

Arts and culture
Mississauga has a vibrant arts community, promoted by the Mississauga Arts Council, which holds an annual awards ceremony, called the MARTYs, to celebrate the city's entertainers, artists, filmmakers, writers, and musicians.

Mississauga's largest festivities such as Canada Day Celebration, Mississauga Rotary Ribfest, Tree Lighting Ceremony, and New Year's Eve Bash generally occur in Celebration Square. The Canada Day celebration was attended by 130,000 people in 2012, the Ribfest has recorded 120,000 visitors in 2012, and the inaugural New Year's Eve in 2011 has attracted 30,000 spectators.

One of the most anticipated events in the city is Carassauga, a festival of cultures that occurs annually during mid-May. It is the second largest cultural festival in Canada. During 2013, 4014 performances took place and 300,000 people attended. Carassauga attempts to display the different cultures around the world by setting up pavilions for countries around Mississauga. Visitors get free public transportation with their ticket to tour the city and explore the different pavilions. Various countries showcase their culture through food stalls, dance performances and small vendors. The event largely takes place in the Hershey Centre.

There are also culture-specific festivals held in Celebration Square, including Fiesta Ng Kalayaan for the Philippines, Viet Summerfest for Vietnam, Muslimfest for the city's Muslim community, Indian festival Diwali and Mosaic Festival, which is the largest South Asian multi-disciplinary arts festival in North America.

The annual Bread and Honey Festival is held in Streetsville, a district that was once an independent rural village. It is held every first weekend of June at Streetsville Memorial Park to commemorate the founding of the village. The festival was inaugurated in 1974, in response to amalgamation with the City of Mississauga. Activities include the Bread and Honey Race, which raises money for charities and local hospitals. It also has its own annual Canada Day celebrations, which are also held at Streetsville Memorial Park.

Port Credit, another neighbourhood that was formerly a town, holds multiple festivals throughout the year. During the summer, there are street performances on multiple venues scattered throughout the district during Buskerfest. The neighbourhood also holds a grand parade named "Paint the Town Red" during Canada Day. Finally, during August, it holds the Mississauga Waterfront Festival, which includes concerts as well as family activities. During September, the Tim Hortons Southside Shuffle is being held to celebrate the neighbourhood's Blues and Jazz Festival, which includes musical performances from local blues and jazz artists.

The community of Malton, which contains a significant number of Sikhs, holds its annual Khalsa Day parade, marching between Sri Guru Singh Sabha (Malton Gurdwara) and Sikh Spiritual Centre (Rexdale Gurdwara Sahib) in Toronto. This parade is attended by 100,000 people.

Mississauga has a significant Jewish population, with active community classes, cultural activities and holiday celebrations.

Library

The Mississauga Library System is a municipally owned network of 18 libraries.

Attractions

Mississauga Celebration Square

In 2006, with the help of Project for Public Spaces, the city started hosting "My Mississauga" summer festivities at its Civic Square. Mississauga planned over 60 free events to bring more people to the city square. The square was transformed and included a movable stage, a snack bar, extra seating, and sports and gaming facilities (basketball nets, hockey arena, chess and checker boards) including a skate park. Some of the events included Senior's day on Tuesday, Family day on Wednesday, Vintage car Thursdays, with the main events being the Canada Day celebration, Rotary Ribfest, Tree Lighting Ceremony, and Beachfest.

Civic Square has completed its restructuring project using federal stimulus money, which features a permanent stage, a larger ice rink (which also serves as a fountain and wading pool during the summer season), media screens, and a permanent restaurant. It officially reopened at 22 June 2011 and has since been renamed as Mississauga Celebration Square. More events have been added such as holding free outdoor live concerts, and live telecast of UEFA European Football Championship. The square also holds weekly programming such as fitness classes, amphitheatre performances and movie nights during the summer, children's activities during spring and fall, and skate parties during the winter. The opening of the square has also allowed the city to hold its first annual New Year's Eve celebration in 2011.

The upper and lower parts of the square used to be separated by a segment of City Centre Drive. However, pedestrian safety issues, a desire to unify the two sections, and a commitment to building a vibrant downtown led the city council to permanently close this segment, uniting the upper and lower parts of the square.

In October 2012, the square had attracted its one millionth visitor.

Celebration Square hosted public viewing parties when the Toronto Raptors played in the 2019 NBA Finals, adopting the name "Jurassic Park West" in reference to the main "Jurassic Park" at downtown Toronto's Maple Leaf Square.

Art Gallery of Mississauga
The Art Gallery of Mississauga (AGM) is a public, not-for-profit art gallery located in the Mississauga Civic Centre right on Celebration Square across from the Living Arts Centre and Square One Shopping Centre. AGM is sponsored by the City of Mississauga, Canada Council for the Arts, Ontario Trillium Foundation and the Ontario Arts Council. The art gallery offers free admission and tours and is open every day. AGM has over 500 copies and is working on creating a digital gallery led by gallery assistant Aaron Guravich.

Shopping
Mississauga also boasts one of the largest shopping malls in Canada called Square One Shopping Centre, located at the City Centre. It has 350+ retail stores and services and attracts 24 million annual visits and over $1 billion in annual retail sales. It operates on most holidays (the exceptions being Good Friday, Easter Sunday and Christmas Day), making it the only shopping mall in the city and one of the few in the Greater Toronto Area that does so. The mall is surrounded by several bars and restaurants, as well as the City Hall, the Central Library, and a movie theatre.

Erin Mills Town Centre, the second largest mall in Mississauga. It is located at the western edge of the city, near Eglinton Avenue at Erin Mills Parkway. The mall used to be notable by a clock tower placed in the centre of the building. As its successor, the clock has been replaced with an iconic glass sphere (283 feet in circumference), as a part of the mall's $100 million redevelopment project. The mall also used to have a movie theatre, a mini-golf course, and a daycare centre, all of which were converted to retail space.

Located at the southeastern corner of the city is the Dixie Outlet Mall, which is Canada's largest enclosed outlet mall. It opened in 1956 when the city was still known as Toronto Township, and is Mississauga's first shopping mall. Many factory outlets of premium brands are located in this mall. As a supporter of Bullfrog Power, it operates using 100% renewable energy. Heartland Town Centre is an unenclosed outlet mall with 180 stores and restaurants. A flea market, the Fantastic Flea Market, is Mississauga's oldest flea market, which opened in 1976.

Erin Mills Town Centre and Dixie Outlet Mall are both closed for most holidays, except for Civic Holiday.

Recreation

Recreational clubs include the Mississauga Figure Skating Club, Mississauga Synchronized Swimming Association, Mississauga Canoe Club, Mississauga Scrabble Club, Don Rowing Club at Port Credit, International Soccer Club Mississauga, and the Mississauga Aquatic Club. Mississauga is home to many indoor playgrounds including Playdium, Kids Time Family Fun Centre, KidSports indoor playground, and Laser Quest Centre. There are over 26 major indoor playgrounds in the city of Mississauga.

Kariya Park in city centre is a Japanese garden opened in 1992, it named after Mississauga’s sister city, Kariya, Japan.

Sports
Mississauga's Paramount Fine Foods Centre (formerly the Hershey Centre) is the city's main sports venue. It is the home arena for Mississauga's minor league teams, the Raptors 905 of the NBA G League and the Mississauga Steelheads of the Ontario Hockey League. The arena was originally built for Mississauga's first OHL team, the Mississauga Icedogs, before they moved to St. Catharines and became the Niagara IceDogs. The Steelheads are the rebranded Mississauga St. Michael's Majors who had moved from Toronto in 2007. The arena was formerly the home of the Mississauga MetroStars of the MASL. It formerly was the home arena for the Mississauga Power of the National Basketball League of Canada before the team dissolved in 2015 after the announcement of the Raptors 905. In 2018, Mississauga's City Council approved a motion to study the feasibility and business case for construction of a new stadium in Mississauga with the hope of gaining a new CPL Team. 

Other hockey teams in Mississauga include the Mississauga Chiefs of the Canadian Women's Hockey League (who play at Iceland Mississauga), the Mississauga Chargers of the Ontario Provincial Junior A Hockey League (who play at Port Credit Arena), and the many teams in the Greater Toronto Hockey League, Mississauga Hockey League, and Mississauga Girls Hockey League that play in the city's 13 arenas. In addition, there is a roller hockey team, the Mississauga Rattlers of the Great Lakes Inline Junior "A" Roller Hockey League
Mississauga also has teams for box lacrosse (Mississauga Tomahawks of the OLA Junior A Lacrosse League), cricket (Mississauga Ramblers of the Toronto and District Cricket League, Mississauga Titans of the Etobicoke District Cricket League), and Canadian football. The Mississauga Football League (MFL) is a youth football program that is for players aged 7–17, founded in 1971. The city also has other amateur football teams in Ontario leagues: the Mississauga Warriors of the Ontario Varsity Football League and the Mississauga Demons of the Ontario Australian Football League. Mississauga's rugby players are now served by the Mississauga Blues through u7 - u17 Youth And Junior Programs as well as hosting one or more Senior Men's and Senior Women's Teams.

Ringette is one of the affiliated youth groups that are allocated ice time by the City of Mississauga (Recreation and Parks Division, Community Services Department) on an allocated priority basis. The Ringette program is administered by the Mississauga Ringette Association.

Mississauga Marathon, a qualifier race for the Boston Marathon, is held in Mississauga annually.

Mississauga is also the host for the following major sports events:
 2000 IIHF Women's World Championship (Co-host)
 2022 Ontario Summer Games, and the Ontario ParaSport Games.

Government

Mississauga City Council consists of the mayor and eleven city councillors, each representing one of the city's eleven numbered wards. The former mayor, Hazel McCallion, at one time the longest-serving mayor in Canada, was succeeded by Bonnie Crombie in November 2014.

Wards and councillors
Council elected in the 2018 municipal election:

The City of Mississauga has had only four mayors in its history. Martin Dobkin was the city's first mayor in 1974. He was then followed by Ron A. Searle. Searle was defeated in 1978 by then-city councillor and former mayor of Streetsville, McCallion. McCallion won 12 consecutive terms as mayor, but she chose to retire prior to the November 2014 election and was succeeded by Bonnie Crombie, who won the election.

McCallion was regarded as a force in provincial politics and often referred to as Hurricane Hazel, after the devastating 1954 storm that struck the Toronto area. McCallion won or was acclaimed in every mayoral election from 1978 to 2010, in some later elections without even campaigning. In October 2010, McCallion won her twelfth term in office with over 76% of the votes. McCallion was the nation's longest-serving mayor and was runner-up in World Mayor 2005. In 2014 McCallion did not run again, but endorsed Crombie, the eventual winner who became mayor in November 2014.

Provincial electoral districts

 Mississauga Centre (provincial electoral district)
 Mississauga East—Cooksville (provincial electoral district)
 Mississauga—Erin Mills (provincial electoral district)
 Mississauga—Lakeshore (provincial electoral district)
 Mississauga—Malton (provincial electoral district)
 Mississauga—Streetsville (provincial electoral district)

Federal electoral districts
 Mississauga Centre
 Mississauga East—Cooksville
 Mississauga—Erin Mills
 Mississauga-Lakeshore
 Mississauga—Malton
 Mississauga—Streetsville

Infrastructure

Transportation

Rail
Mississauga is on three major railway lines (one each owned by the Canadian National Railway, the Canadian Pacific Railway, and Metrolinx). Toronto–Sarnia Via Rail trains on the Quebec City-Windsor Corridor pass through Mississauga and make request stops at Malton GO Station in the northeast of the city. Other Via Rail services stop in the neighbouring cities of Brampton, Oakville, and Toronto.

Commuter rail

Commuter rail service is provided by GO Transit, a division of Metrolinx, on the Lakeshore West, Kitchener, and Milton lines. All-day service is provided along the Lakeshore West line, while the Kitchener and Milton lines serve commuters going to and from Toronto's Union Station during rush hours.

Bus

The city's public transit service, MiWay (formerly Mississauga Transit), provides bus service along more than 90 routes across the city, and connects to commuter rail with GO Transit as well as with Brampton Transit, Oakville Transit, and the Toronto Transit Commission (TTC). MiWay operates routes for both local service (branded as "MiLocal") and limited-stop service (branded as "MiExpress").

Intercity buses operated by GO Transit stop at GO Train stations throughout the city and the Square One Bus Terminal.

Mississauga Transitway

A 12-station busway similar to Ottawa's Transitway was built parallel to Highway 403 from Winston Churchill Boulevard to Renforth Avenue, via the Mississauga City Centre Transit Terminal. Opened in stages, the Mississauga Transitway was completed on 22 November 2017 with the opening of the final station: Renforth. The service also connects to Kipling Subway Station in Toronto, via mixed lane traffic after Renforth station.

Hurontario LRT

There are plans for the construction of an LRT line along Hurontario Street stretching from Port Credit to southern Brampton, and possibly to Brampton's downtown. The project went through the Transit Project Assessment Process (TPAP) which includes environmental assessment. The line will be fully funded by the provincial government, with construction set to begin in 2018. Rapid transit lines could possibly be built on some other main thoroughfares, namely Dundas Street and Lakeshore Road, but no definite dates have been set.

Toronto Subway

In addition to the  light rail line, there are plans to extend Line 5 Eglinton to Renforth station and Toronto Pearson International Airport though eastern Mississauga by 2030–2031 bringing the Toronto Subway into Mississauga. There will be 4 stops in the city at Renforth Gateway connecting with the Mississauga Transitway and serving the Airport Corporate Centre, Convair serving the GTAA headquarters and airfield and aircraft maintenance areas, Silver Dart serving rental car facilities and airport hotels, and Pearson Airport serving the airport at a future transit hub.

Highways
Highway 401 (or the Macdonald-Cartier Freeway, connecting Windsor to the Quebec border) passes through the city's north end. The eastern part uses the collector/express lane system and feeds into Highway 403, the main freeway in the city, which runs through the City Centre and Erin Mills areas. The Queen Elizabeth Way, the city's first freeway, runs through the southern half of the city. These three freeways each run east–west, with the exception of the 403 from the 401 to Cawthra Road, and from the 407 to QEW. North of the 401, the collector lanes of the 403 become Highway 410, which goes to Brampton. Part of Highway 409 is within the city of Mississauga, and it provides access to Pearson Airport. Two other freeways run along or close to Mississauga's municipal borders. Highway 407 runs metres from the northern city limits in a power transmission corridor and forms the city's boundary with Milton between highways 401 and 403. Highway 427 forms the Toronto-Mississauga boundary in the northeast, and is always within 2 kilometres of the boundary further south, with the exception of the area around Centennial Park.

Air

Lester B. Pearson International Airport (YYZ), operated by the Greater Toronto Airports Authority in the northeastern part of the city, is the largest and busiest airport in Canada. In 2015, it handled 41,036,847 passengers and 443,958 aircraft movements. It is a major North American global gateway, handling more international passengers than any airport in North America other than John F. Kennedy International Airport. Pearson is the main hub for Air Canada, and a hub for passenger airline WestJet and cargo airline FedEx Express. It is served by over 75 airlines, having over 180 destinations.

Bicycle
Over 1,000 Mississauga citizens and stakeholders contributed their thoughts and ideas to help develop this plan. The plan focuses on fostering cycling as a way of life in the city, building an integrated network of cycling routes and aims to adopt a safety first approach to cycling.

Emergency services
Peel Regional Police provide policing within the city of Mississauga and airport. In addition, the Ontario Provincial Police have a Port Credit detachment in the city for patrolling provincial highways. Mississauga Fire and Emergency Services provide fire fighting services and Peel Regional Paramedic Services provides emergency medical services. Toronto Pearson also has its own fire department with two halls that service calls within the airport grounds.

Healthcare
The city's two main hospitals—Credit Valley Hospital and Mississauga Hospital—were amalgamated into the Trillium Health Partners hospital group in December 2011. The health system and the administration for students in Mississauga was the property of the Peel District School Board Health Centre and the health support for citizens in Mississauga was the property of Peel Health Centre. The eastern part of Mississauga was the property of Pearson Health (Greater Toronto Area Health Department).

Education

Mississauga is the home to the University of Toronto Mississauga, one of three campuses of the University of Toronto. UTM has an enrollment of approximately 13,200 students. It is growing at a rate of about 1,000 students per year since 2002, following a major expansion. U of T Mississauga has 15 academic departments, 143 programs and 87 areas of study, and includes Institutes for Management and Innovation, and Communication, Culture, Information and Technology. The Mississauga Academy of Medicine is located on campus in the Terrence Donnelly Health Sciences Complex. The campus employs over 2,000 full- and part-time employees (including 800 permanent faculty and staff), and has more than 47,000 alumni, including astronaut Dr. Roberta Bondar, filmmaker Richie Mehta, actor Zaib Shaikh and writer/poet Dionne Brand. The $35-million Innovation Complex, which opened in September 2014, houses the Institute for Management and Innovation, a new model for business education combining management studies with key industry sectors, and the first phase of the multi-phase North Building reconstruction, known as Deerfield Hall, opened in September 2014.

Sheridan College opened a new $46 million facility in Mississauga in 2011. The school has two main concentrations: business education, and programs to accelerate the movement of new Canadians into the workforce. The  campus will be located on an  parcel of land in City Centre just north of the Living Arts Centre. The campus accommodated 1,700 students upon completion of phase one of construction in Fall 2011. Phase two of construction after 2011 increased capacity by 3,740 students to a combined total of 5,000; it also included construction of a 10-level municipal parking garage.

Mississauga is served by the Peel District School Board, which operates the secular Anglophone public schools, the Dufferin-Peel Catholic District School Board, which operates Catholic Anglophone public schools, the Conseil scolaire Viamonde, which operates secular Francophone schools, and the Conseil scolaire de district catholique Centre-Sud, which operates Catholic Francophone schools. Within the city, the four boards run a total of more than 150 schools.

Multiple schools in Mississauga also offer specialized programs:
 French immersion schools in multiple locations across the city such as Applewood Heights Secondary School, Clarkson Secondary School and Streetsville Secondary School
 Extended French Program at St. Thomas More School, Lorne Park Secondary School, Philip Pocock Catholic Secondary School and St. Aloysius Gonzaga Secondary School
 Regional Arts Program at Queen Elizabeth Senior Public School, Cawthra Park Secondary School and Iona Catholic Secondary School
 International Business and Technology Program at Allan A. Martin Senior Public School and Gordon Graydon Memorial Secondary School
 International Baccalaureate Program at St. Francis Xavier Secondary School, Glenforest Secondary School, Bronte College and Erindale Secondary School.
 Sci Tech Program at Tomken Road Middle School and Port Credit Secondary School
 Regional Enhanced Program at Glenforest Secondary School, The Woodlands School and Lorne Park Secondary School.
 Regional Sports Program at Applewood Heights Secondary School
 International and Executive Leadership Academy at TL Kennedy Secondary School

Media

Mississauga is part of the Toronto media market and is served by media based in Toronto, with markets in the Greater Toronto Area (GTA) that cover most of the news in the GTA. Examples of this being the majority of radio stations transmitting from the nearby CN Tower in Toronto. However, Mississauga also has The Mississauga News, a regional newspaper that is published two days a week in print and daily online. There is also the Sunday Times, a community newspaper for the South Asian community that is published weekly in print and also available online, as well as Modern Mississauga, a bi-monthly general-interest print and digital magazine.

The city also has three local radio stations: 
 AM 960 CKNT, local news/talk radio
 AM 1650 CINA, multicultural station mainly targeted to Indian and Pakistani audiences.
 FM 91.9 CFRE, the campus radio station of the University of Toronto Mississauga.

The following national cable television stations also broadcast from Mississauga:
 Rogers Television, community channel
 The Shopping Channel, broadcasts nationally from Mississauga
 The Weather Network, broadcast nationally from Mississauga 1998–2005
 Bite TV, Canada's first interactive television station.

Sister cities
Mississauga has one sister city:
  Kariya, Aichi, Japan (1981)

Notable people

Freedom of the City
The Freedom of the City is the highest honour that a Canadian municipality can bestow on an individual or military unit.
The following people and military units have received the Freedom of the City of Mississauga.

Individuals
 Hazel McCallion : 12 April 2017.
 Bianca Andreescu: 15 September 2019.
 Dr. Mohamad Fakih: 15 November 2019.
 Members of the Band Triumph (Rik Emmett, Mike Levine and Gil Moore): 25 November 2019.

Military units
 The Lorne Scots Regiment : 2 July 2014.
 The Toronto Scottish Regiment: 20 September 2014.

See also

 List of tallest buildings in Mississauga
List of cities in Ontario
List of tallest buildings in Ontario
Greater Toronto Area
Regional Municipality of Peel

References

External links

 
Cities in Ontario
Lower-tier municipalities in Ontario
Populated places established in 1805
1805 establishments in Upper Canada
Populated places on Lake Ontario in Canada
Anishinaabe lands